Nicolás Almagro was the defending champion; however, he lost 1–6, 7–5, 2–6 to Juan Carlos Ferrero in the quarterfinals.David Ferrer won in the final 6–3, 3–6, 6–1 against Juan Carlos Ferrero.

Seeds

Draw

Finals

Top half

Bottom half

Qualifying

Seeds

Qualifiers

Draw

First qualifier

Second qualifier

Third qualifier

Fourth qualifier

External links
Main Draw
Qualifying Draw

Abierto Mexicano Telcel - Men's Singles
2010 Abierto Mexicano Telcel